Gencay Kasapçı (9 March 1933 – 29 November 2017) was a Turkish painter who specialized in fresco, glass art and mosaic.

Life
Gencay Ataseven was born to Vicdani Ataseven and Şaziment in Ankara, Turkey on 9 March 1933. After finishing primary and high school in İstanbul in 1950, she graduated from the Academy of Fine Arts (current Mimar Sinan University) in 1954.

She then returned to Ankara to study archaeology in 1957. She married Abdullah Kasapçı, and later she settled in her husband's hometown Mersin. Gencay Kasapçı died in Mersin on 29 November 2017.

Art
After winning a scholarship in 1959, she went to Italy and worked on fresco and mosaic under Prof. Collaccki. She stayed in Rome between 1960 and 1967, founding her own workshop. While in Italy, she illustrated some books for the publishers.
In 1963, Kasapcı painted a mosaic wall of size  for Ziraat Bank in Ankara. Some of her other artworks are wall paintings in the Middle East Technical University, Türkiye İş Bankası,'s headquarters in Ankara, Divan Hotel Ankara and Hotel Etap Marmara in Istanbul. Between 1976 and 1983, she was the art consultant and manager in "Vakko Art Gallery" in Ankara. In Mersin, Kasapcı designed and made the "Freedom Monument" in 1994 and "Orange Tree" statue in 1995. Between 1994 and 2000, she worked as an art consultant in the "Replica Art Gallery" in Istanbul. Her works can be seen in many collections both in Turkey and abroad. Some of her paintings were printed as cards by the TEMA Foundation, UNICEF and TAP. According to Hürriyet newspaper, she was the sole representative of the Zero art movement in Turkey.

Achievements and awards
Kasapçı's awards are the following:
 1960 International Gubbio Art Contest (2nd place)
 1961 International Gubbio Ornament Contest (1st place)
 1974 DYO Art Contest (1st place)
 1980 "Award of Success" at Home Decoration Art Contest
 1983 "Honorable Mention" at Vakko Art Contest
 2003 "Award of Success" at 64th Art and Sculpture Contest by Ministry of Culture
 2007 "Award of Profession" by Mersin Kızkalesi Rotary Club
 2009 "Award of Profession" by Mersin Rotary Club
 2011 Successful "Woman of the Year" Award by Mersin Soroptimist Club
 2013 Mersin International Music Festival Art Award
 2013 ÇAĞSAV Art Award
 2013 "Respect to Master" Award by İzmir 5. International  EgeArt

References

1933 births
2017 deaths
People from Ankara
Academy of Fine Arts in Istanbul alumni
20th-century Turkish women artists
21st-century Turkish women artists
Mosaic artists
Fresco painters